Cyphoma emarginatum, common name : the Emarginate Cyphoma, is a species of sea snail, a marine gastropod mollusk in the family Ovulidae, the ovulids, cowry allies or false cowries.

Description
The shell size varies between 15 mm and 22 mm

Distribution
This species is distributed in the tropical Eastern Pacific Ocean.

References

 Cate, C. N. 1973. A systematic revision of the recent Cypraeid family Ovulidae. Veliger 15 (supplement): 1–117
 Lorenz F. & Fehse D. (2009). The Living Ovulidae - A manual of the families of Allied Cowries: Ovulidae, Pediculariidae and Eocypraeidae. Conchbooks, Hackenheim, Germany.

External links
 

Ovulidae
Gastropods described in 1830